Takayuki Ikeda is the President, CEO, and Representative Director of Toshiba Tec Corporation, a subsidiary of Toshiba. He has been credited with creating the concept for the video game Super Princess Peach.

At Toshiba, he previously served in a number of other roles.

References

Japanese businesspeople
Living people
Year of birth missing (living people)